Hortiboletus is a genus of fungi in the family Boletaceae.  It was  circumscribed in 2015 by Giampaolo Simonini, Alfredo Vizzini, and Matteo Gelardi. The erection of Hortiboletus follows recent molecular studies that outlined a new phylogenetic framework for the Boletaceae. Hortiboletus is derived from the Latin word hortus "garden", referring to a typical habitat of the type species, Hortiboletus rubellus. The bolete H. bubalinus, originally described as a Boletus and later placed in Xerocomus,  was transferred to the genus by Bálint Dima. In 2015, Alona Yu. Biketova transferred Boletus campestris and Boletus engelii to Hortiboletus.

Species
Hortiboletus amygdalinus Xue T. Zhu & Zhu L. Yang 2016
Hortiboletus bubalinus (Oolbekk. & Duin) L. Albert & Dima 2015
Hortiboletus campestris (A.H. Sm. & Thiers) Biketova & Wasser 2015
 Hortiboletus coccyginus (Thiers) C.F. Schwarz, N. Siegel & J.L. Frank 2020
 Hortiboletus engelii (Hlaváček) Biketova & Wasser 2015 
 Hortiboletus indorubellus K. Das, D. Chakr., Baghela, S.K. Singh & Dentinger 2016
 Hortiboletus kohistanensis A. Naseer, S. Sarwar & A.N. Khalid 2019
 Hortiboletus rubellus (Krombh.) Simonini, Vizzini & Gelardi 2015
 Hortiboletus subpaludosus (W.F. Chiu) Xue T. Zhu & Zhu L. Yang 2016
List of species from the Index Fungorum.

References

Boletaceae
Boletales genera